Albert Nađ (born 29 October 1974) is a Serbian professional football manager and a former player who played as a defensive midfielder. He is the assistant manager at Partizan. At international level, Nađ represented Serbia and Montenegro at UEFA Euro 2000 (as FR Yugoslavia) and 2006 FIFA World Cup.

Club career
Born in Zemun, Nađ started out at his local club Teleoptik. He later joined the youth system of Partizan, making his senior debut in the title-winning 1992–93 campaign. Subsequently, Nađ was one of the team's most regular players in the 1993–94 season, as they won the double. He spent another two years in the country, collecting one more domestic league title in 1996, while captaining the side. In total, Nađ made 111 league appearances and scored eight goals for Partizan under manager Ljubiša Tumbaković between 1992 and 1996.

In July 1996, Nađ moved abroad to Spain and signed with Betis. He made 30 league appearances in his debut season in La Liga, as the club finished in fourth place. Nađ stayed at Betis for one more season, before moving on loan to Oviedo in the summer of 1998. He was eventually acquired by Oviedo in July 1999. However, Nađ made only 16 appearances in the 1999–2000 season. He was later loaned to Segunda División club Elche until the end of the 2000–01 campaign. After returning from loan, Nađ spent another season with Oviedo, before leaving the club due to unpaid wages in August 2002.

In September 2002, Nađ officially returned to his parent club Partizan, penning a one-year deal. He won the national league in his comeback season. In early 2004, Nađ signed an 18-month extension to his contract with the club. He was also a member of the squad that won the title with an unbeaten record in 2005. Shortly after, Nađ signed a three-year extension to his contract with Partizan. He eventually left the club by mutual agreement in July 2007.

In August 2007, Nađ went abroad again and joined Russian side Rostov, together with Ivica Kralj. They failed to help the club avoid relegation from the Premier League, finishing bottom of the table. Eventually, Nađ left Rostov in December 2007, alongside Kralj and some other players.

In January 2008, Nađ signed a two-and-a-half-year contract with Čukarički. He played his last career match for Čukarički in the final league fixture of the 2008–09 season, against his parent club Partizan on 30 May 2009. After being cheered by the Grobari in the 68th minute, Nađ responded by lifting his Čukarički jersey to reveal Partizan's jersey underneath. He was substituted in the 76 minute, eventually ending his active playing career.

International career
Nađ made his international debut for FR Yugoslavia in a 0–2 loss to Brazil on 23 December 1994. He scored his first national team goal in his second game, a 3–1 win over Hong Kong on 31 January 1995. After missing out on the 1998 FIFA World Cup, Nađ was named by Vujadin Boškov in the country's final UEFA Euro 2000 squad. He made two appearances in the group stage of the tournament, as they were eventually eliminated in the quarter-finals.

Almost four years later, Nađ made a comeback to the national team, playing the full 90 minutes in a 1–1 friendly draw against Northern Ireland on 28 April 2004. He was also selected by Ilija Petković to represent Serbia and Montenegro at the 2006 FIFA World Cup. Subsequently, Nađ made two appearances in Group C, including his last game for the national team on 21 June 2006. He came off the bench early into the match and received two yellow cards by the end of the first half of an eventual 2–3 loss to Ivory Coast.

Post-playing career
In December 2009, Nađ was named as the sports coordinator at his parent club Partizan. He was also responsible for the club's transfer windows between 2010 and 2012. In May 2013, Nađ was officially appointed as sporting director of Partizan. He left the position at the end of his contract in May 2014.

In early 2017, Nađ became sporting director of Serbian League Belgrade side Rakovica while simultaneously taking over the managerial role at the club.

In August 2019, Nađ returned to Partizan and joined Savo Milošević's staff as an assistant. He performed the role for less than three months, before replacing Žarko Lazetić as manager of their affiliated club Teleoptik.

Career statistics

Club

International

Honours
Partizan
 First League of FR Yugoslavia: 1992–93, 1993–94, 1995–96, 2002–03, 2004–05
 FR Yugoslavia Cup: 1993–94
Betis
 Copa del Rey: Runner-up 1996–97

References

External links

 
 
 
 
 

2006 FIFA World Cup players
Association football midfielders
Elche CF players
Expatriate footballers in Russia
Expatriate footballers in Spain
FC Rostov players
First League of Serbia and Montenegro players
FK Čukarički players
FK Partizan non-playing staff
FK Partizan players
FK Teleoptik managers
La Liga players
People from Zemun
Real Betis players
Real Oviedo players
Russian Premier League players
Segunda División players
Serbia and Montenegro expatriate footballers
Serbia and Montenegro expatriate sportspeople in Spain
Serbia and Montenegro footballers
Serbia and Montenegro international footballers
Serbian expatriate footballers
Serbian expatriate sportspeople in Russia
Serbian football managers
Serbian footballers
Serbian people of Hungarian descent
Serbian SuperLiga players
Footballers from Belgrade
UEFA Euro 2000 players
Yugoslav footballers
Yugoslavia under-21 international footballers
1974 births
Living people